Chainalysis is an American blockchain analysis firm headquartered in New York City. The company was co-founded by Michael Gronager and Jonathan Levin in 2014. Its customers have included the United States's Federal Bureau of Investigation, Drug Enforcement Agency, and the Internal Revenue Service Criminal Investigation, as well as the United Kingdom's National Crime Agency.

History
Chainalysis was formed to be the official investigator of the hack of cryptocurrency exchange Mt. Gox when Michael Gronager was the Chief Operating Officer of Kraken. His company was employed by the bankruptcy trustee of Mt. Gox to investigate the hack.

In October 2019, they helped the United States Department of Justice shut down the world's largest child abuse website.

In March 2021, they partnered with crypto compliance company Notabene to comply with the FATF's Travel Rule across jurisdictions. American business publication Fast Company referred to this partnership one of the top 10 most innovative joint ventures of 2022.

Noted investigations
Chainalysis has helped law enforcement recover cryptocurrencies from illegal enterprises. For example, the company helped law enforcement to recover over $1 billion from the take down of the dark web marketplace Silk Road. Further, the company also helped to attribute seven 2021 cryptocurrency thefts to the North Korean Lazarus Group.

References

Further reading

External links

Blockchain entities
Bitcoin companies
American companies established in 2014